Belarus competed at the 2016 Winter Youth Olympics in Lillehammer, Norway from 12 to 21 February 2016.

Alpine skiing

Boys

Biathlon

Boys

Girls

Mixed

Cross-country skiing

Boys

Girls

Figure skating

Couples

Mixed NOC team trophy

Ice hockey

Snowboarding

Slopestyle

Speed skating

Boys

Girls

Mixed team sprint

See also
Belarus at the 2016 Summer Olympics

References

2016 in Belarusian sport
Nations at the 2016 Winter Youth Olympics
Belarus at the Youth Olympics